A smart gun, also called a smart-gun, or smartgun, is a firearm that can detect its authorized user(s) or something that is normally only possessed by its authorized user(s). The term is also used in science fiction to refer to various types of semi-automatic  firearms.

Smart guns have one or more systems that allow them to fire only when activated by an authorized user. Those systems typically employ RFID chips or other proximity tokens, fingerprint recognition, magnetic rings, or mechanical locks. They can thereby prevent accidental shootings, gun thefts, and criminal usage by persons not authorized to use the guns.

Related to smart guns are other smart firearms safety devices such as biometric or RFID activated accessories and safes.

Commercial availability 
No smart gun has ever been sold on the commercial market in the United States. The Armatix iP1, a .22 caliber handgun with an active RFID watch used to unlock it, is the most mature smart gun developed. It was briefly planned to be offered at a few retailers before being quickly withdrawn due to pressure from gun-rights advocates concerned that it would trigger the New Jersey Childproof Handgun Law.

As of 2019, a number of startups and companies including Armatix, Biofire, LodeStar Firearms, and Swiss company SAAR are purportedly developing various smart handguns and rifles, but none have brought the technology to market.

Reception 
Reception to the concept of smart gun technology has been mixed. There have been public calls to develop the technology, most notably from President Obama. Gun-rights groups including the National Rifle Association of America have expressed concerns that the technology could be mandated, and some firearms enthusiasts are concerned that the technology wouldn't be reliable enough to trust.

National Rifle Association 
The NRA and its membership boycotted Smith & Wesson after it was revealed in 1999 that the company was developing a smart gun for the U.S. government.

More recently, the official policy of the NRA-ILA, the lobbying arm of the NRA, with regards to smart guns, is as follows: "The NRA doesn't oppose the development of 'smart' guns, nor the ability of Americans to voluntarily acquire them. However, NRA opposes any law prohibiting Americans from acquiring or possessing firearms that don't possess "smart" gun technology."

Law enforcement 
Some smart gun proponents have called for federal, state, and local police organizations to take the lead on adopting smart gun technology, either voluntarily or via purchasing mandate.  There has been scattered support for voluntary test programs from some law enforcement leaders, including San Francisco Police Chief Greg Suhr, who has said, "Officer safety is huge, so you wouldn't want to compel that upon officers.  But we have so many officers who are so into technology, I am all but certain there are officers that would be willing to do such a pilot.".

Richard Beary, president of the International Association of Chiefs of Police, said there would be "plenty of agencies interested in beta testing the technology" and that "[a smart gun] can't be 99 percent accurate, it has to be 100 percent accurate. It has to work every single time." James Pasco, executive director of the Fraternal Order of Police, which represents 325,000 officers nationwide, has stated, "Police officers in general, federal officers in particular, shouldn't be asked to be the guinea pigs in evaluating a firearm that nobody's even seen yet.  We have some very, very serious questions."

New Jersey mandate 

In the United States, New Jersey passed the Childproof Handgun Bill into state law on December 23, 2002, which would have required that all guns sold in the state of New Jersey have a mechanism to prevent unauthorized users from firing it, taking effect three years after such a smart gun is approved by the state. Weapons used by law enforcement officers would be exempt from the smart gun requirement. In July 2019, Governor Phil Murphy signed into law a bill which repealed substantially all of the original Childproof Handgun Law and replaced it with a requirement that after the state Attorney General approves a production model each firearms retailer in the state would be required to carry and display at least one smart gun on their shelves with "a sign... disclosing the features of personalized handguns that are not offered by traditional handguns".

The potential effects of New Jersey's smart gun law has also influenced opposition to the technology in the United States; two attempts to sell the Armatix iP1 smart gun in California and Maryland were met with opposition from gun rights groups, who argued that allowing the gun to be sold in the United States would trigger the law. In December 2014, the Attorney General of New Jersey determined that the Armatix iP1 would not meet the legal criteria sufficient to trigger the mandate.

Reliability concerns
Many firearm enthusiasts object to smart guns on a philosophical and regulatory basis. Gun ownership advocate Kenneth W. Royce, writing under the pen name of "Boston T. Party", wrote that "no defensive firearm should ever rely upon any technology more advanced than Newtonian physics. That includes batteries, radio links, encryption, scanning devices and microcomputers."

TechCrunch technology and outdoors journalist Jon Stokes summarizes the reliability concerns with smart guns stating,

Potential advantages

Gun owners 
Smart firearms safety technology is intended to prevent the accidental use and misuse of firearms by children and teens, as well as reducing accidental discharges or the use of a firearm against its owner if the firearm is stolen or taken away. Smart guns may also reduce incidents of suicide by unauthorized users of a firearm.

Law enforcement 
Law enforcement applications also hold promise; San Francisco Police Chief Greg Suhr went on record supporting smart guns for their potential to reduce the risk of having a law enforcement officer's gun used against him or her, and for rendering stolen guns unfireable. Richard Beary, president of the International Association of Chiefs of Police, was quoted in the Washington Post as saying there would be "plenty of agencies interested in beta testing the [smart gun] technology."

In April 2014, Attorney General Eric Holder told a House appropriations subcommittee that his agency is exploring smart gun technology as a means for curbing gun violence. The Justice Department requested $382.1 million in increased spending for its fiscal year 2014 budget for "gun safety," a figure which includes $2 million for "Gun Safety Technology" grants, which would award prizes for technologies that are "proven to be reliable and effective."

In October 2013 the European Commission published a document by commissioner Cecilia Malmström, stating that "the Commission will work with the firearms industry to explore technological solutions, such as biometric sensors where personal data is stored in the firearm, for ensuring that purchased firearms may only be used by their legal owner. It will carry out a detailed cost-benefit analysis on the question of making such 'smart gun' security features mandatory for firearms lawfully sold in the EU."

Potential disadvantages 
Joseph Steinberg writes that "biometrics take time to process and are often inaccurate – especially when a user is under duress – as is likely going to be the case in any situation in which he needs to brandish a gun.... it is not ideal to add a requirement for power to devices utilized in cases of emergency that did not need electricity previously. How many fire codes allow fire extinguishers that require a battery to operate?" Steinberg further writes that "smartguns might be hackable" or "susceptible to government tracking or jamming...Firearms must be able to be disassembled in order to be cleaned and maintained. One of the principles of information security is that someone who has physical access to a machine can undermine its security." In a follow up piece published in January 2016, Steinberg noted that smartguns that utilize wireless communications to detect that the shooter is wearing a watch, bracelet, or other device may "allow criminals (and police) to identify who is carrying a weapon" undermining "one of the reasons that some states require people to carry their weapons concealed; if all civilian-carried guns are concealed, criminals do not know who is carrying and who is not, so they have to fear mugging everyone, which protects the unarmed as well as the armed."

According to an article on an NRA website, other concerns are that smart guns may make a firearm more likely to fail when needed for self-defense.  "Batteries go dead, temperature or moisture can harm electronics and many 'smart gun' designs, such as Armatix's iP1, require that a person wear a watch, bracelet, or other device." Smart guns may also take considerable time to be ready for firing from a "cold start."

In science fiction 
Smart guns are commonly used in science fiction, where they may not only have biometric identification, but also have auto-aiming capabilities or smart bullets. A prominent example is the Lawgiver used by Judge Dredd, which is linked to his DNA. Another is the M56 Smart Gun from Aliens, which is carried via a waist-mounted robotic arm. The concept was later used in a US Army prototype, although engineers moved the mount from the waist to the back, due to ergonomic issues.

A smart gun was also featured in the movie Shoot 'Em Up (film).

See also
Locationized gun
Sentry gun

References

External links 
 Long, Duncan (July 20, 2002). "Do You Really Need a Smart Gun?" duncanlong.com
 Rosenwald, Michael S. (May 2, 2014). "Threats against Maryland gun dealer raise doubts about future of smart guns". The Washington Post

Smart devices
Trial and research firearms
Gun politics in the United States
Firearm safety
Biometrics
Science fiction weapons
Fictional firearms